Aud Hvammen (born 31 May 1943) is a Norwegian alpine skier. She was born in Geilo, and is the sister of Margit Hvammen. She is married to Peder Lunde, and mother of Jeanette Lunde. She participated at the 1968 Winter Olympics in Grenoble, where she competed in slalom and giant slalom.

She became Norwegian champion in slalom in 1964, in giant slalom in 1965, 1967 and 1968, and in alpine combined in 1964.

References

External links

1943 births
Living people
People from Hol
Norwegian female alpine skiers
Olympic alpine skiers of Norway
Alpine skiers at the 1968 Winter Olympics
Sportspeople from Viken (county)